The 71st edition of the La Flèche Wallonne cycling classic took place on April 25, 2007 and was won by the 2004 winner Davide Rebellin ahead of 2006 winner Alejandro Valverde and 2005 winner Danilo Di Luca.

Results

2007-04-25: Charleroi-Huy, 202 km

Individual 2007 UCI ProTour standings after race 
As of April 25, 2007, after the 2007 La Flèche Wallonne 

 82 riders have scored at least one point on the 2007 UCI ProTour.

References

2007 UCI ProTour
2007
2007 in Belgian sport